Christian Alonso Martínez Mena (born 19 April 1994) is a professional footballer who plays as a midfielder for Liga FPD club San Carlos. Born in Costa Rica and of Salvadoran descent, Martínez represented the Costa Rica national team in two friendlies, before switching to represent the El Salvador national team.

Club career
Martínez began his career with his local club Municipal Liberia, making his first professional appearance in a 2–0 Liga FPD win over La U Universitarios on 2 August 2015. On 14 January 2016, he transferred to Deportivo Saprissa signing a 3-year contract. On 15 January 2019, he transferred to San Carlos. Martínez won 3 Liga FPD titles, 2 with Saprissa, and 1 with San Carlos - their first title in their history.

International career

Costa Rica
Martínez was born in Costa Rica, and is of Salvadoran descent through his father. A youth international for Costa Rica, he debuted for the senior Costa Rica national team in a friendly 0–0 tie with Bosnia and Herzegovina on 27 March 2021.

El Salvador
He switched to represent the El Salvador national team in September 2021. He debuted with El Salvador in a friendly 2–0 loss to Guatemala on 24 September 2021.

Honours
Deportivo Saprissa
Liga FPD: 2016–17 Invierno, 2017–18 Clausura

San Carlos
Liga FPD: 2018–19 Clausura

References

External links
 
 

1994 births
Living people
People from Guanacaste Province
Salvadoran footballers
El Salvador international footballers
Costa Rican footballers
Costa Rica international footballers
Salvadoran people of Costa Rican descent
Costa Rican people of Salvadoran descent
Association football midfielders
Deportivo Saprissa players
Liga FPD players
Dual internationalists (football)